Interstate 895 (I-895) was a planned  auxiliary Interstate Highway in New Jersey and Pennsylvania that would have provided a freeway between I-295 near Burlington in Burlington County, New Jersey, and I-95 near Bristol in Bucks County, Pennsylvania.

Route description

History

In 1963, the Delaware River Port Authority proposed several new bridges across the Delaware River in the Philadelphia area, including a high-level crossing between Bristol, Pennsylvania, and Burlington, New Jersey, near the existing Burlington–Bristol Bridge. Following this proposal, a freeway was planned to link this bridge to I-295 near Burlington and I-95 near Bristol. This proposed freeway would be designated I-895 in the late 1960s. I-895 would have completed the partial beltway around Trenton formed by I-95 and I-295 as well as provided a beltway around Philadelphia along with the Pennsylvania Turnpike, I-476, and I-295. The proposed six lane freeway was meant to have two mainline interchanges with US Route 13 (US 13) in Pennsylvania and US 130 in New Jersey, and the terminus interchanges with I-95 and I-295, giving the freeway four total interchanges from start to finish. Once the freeway met I-295, there were plans to extend it as the Route 72 freeway toward Long Beach Island where it would meet the existing Route 72 at Route 70.

In the early 1970s, I-895 gained opposition from area residents, who feared the road would cause disruption to residential areas in both Burlington and Bristol. The alignment for I-895 was approved by the Federal Highway Administration in 1973. The approach roads to the bridge were approved by New Jersey Governor Brendan Byrne in December 1975, but Pennsylvania Governor Milton Shapp opposed it because there was not a connection to I-95. As a result, the Burlington County Bridge Commission decided to build the Pennsylvania portion of the freeway. However, rising costs and desire of funds for mass transit led to the cancelation of I-895 in 1981, with the money allocated to the road transferred to other road and mass transit projects.

Exit list

See also

References

External links

I-895 on Kurumi.com
Pennsylvania Highways: I-895
The Roads of Metro Philadelphia: Interstate 895 - New Jersey / Pennsylvania (unbuilt)

95-8
95-8 New Jersey-Pennsylvania
95-8
95-8
8 New Jersey-Pennsylvania
895